Escuela Nacional Preparatoria Plantel 1 "Gabino Barreda" is a national senior high school of the National Autonomous University of Mexico (UNAM) Escuela Nacional Preparatoria (ENP1) system located in Xochimilco, Mexico City.

References

External links
 Escuela Nacional Preparatoria Plantel 1 "Gabino Barreda"

Records
 Paro más corto
a su legendario paro de media hora realizado el día nueve de marzo del año 2020.

 Comunidad más apática
a su bellísima comunidad estudiantil reconocida por las preparatorias hermanas como la más apática ante las problemáticas que les rodean y afectan cotidianamente bajo excusas como "no existe porque no me ha pasado"

Comité más veces desconocido
al comité estudiantil de la escuela nacional preparatoria número uno, por haber sido desconocido y reelegido por la misma comunidad por cuatro ocasiones consecutivas en el mismo ciclo escolar 2019-2020.

High schools in Mexico City